is the first compilation album released by the Japanese rock band Buck-Tick. It was released on cassette and CD on March 21, 1992 through Victor Entertainment. All of the tracks on the compilation were re-recorded and contain different musical arrangements, because of this some argue that it is a studio or remix album. The album was digitally remastered and re-released on September 19, 2002, with a bonus track. It was remastered and re-released again on September 5, 2007. Koroshi no Shirabe: This Is Not Greatest Hits peaked at number one on the Oricon charts. It was certified gold in April 1992 has sold 340,000 copies worldwide since.

Track listing

Personnel
 Atsushi Sakurai – lead vocals
 Hisashi Imai – lead guitar, backing vocals
 Hidehiko Hoshino – rhythm guitar, backing vocals
 Yutaka Higuchi – bass
 Toll Yagami – drums

Additional performers
 Kazutoshi Yokoyama – keyboards
 Tadashi Nanba – backing vocals

Production
 Hitoshi Hiruma – producer, recording, mixing
 Buck-Tick – producers
 Takafumi Muraki; Osamu Takagi – executive producers
 Takahiro Uchida; Shigetoshi Naitoh; Yasuaki "V" Shindoh – engineers
 Takashi Aonuma; Shinichi Ishizuka; Yoko Ohta; Fumio Hasegawa; Hisashi Ikeda – assistant engineers
 Ken Sakaguchi – cover art, graphic design
 Kazuhiro Kitaoka – photography

References

Buck-Tick albums
Victor Entertainment compilation albums
1992 compilation albums
Japanese-language albums